The Nuremberg Palace of Justice is a building complex in Nuremberg, Bavaria, Germany. It was constructed from 1909 to 1916 and houses the appellate court (Oberlandesgericht), the regional court (Landgericht), the local court (Amtsgericht) and the public prosecutor's office (Staatsanwaltschaft). The Nuremberg Trials Memorial (Memorium Nürnberger Prozesse) is located on the top floor of the courthouse. The International Nuremberg Principles Academy is housed on the ground floor of the east wing since 2020.

Nuremberg Trials
The building was chosen as the location of the Nuremberg trials (19451949) for the main surviving German war criminals of World War II because it was almost undamaged, was large enough, and included a large prison complex. The choice of the city of Nuremberg was symbolic as the Nazi Party had held its large Nuremberg rallies in the city.

The trials took place in courtroom number 600, situated in the east wing of the palace of Justice. The courtroom was used until 1 March 2020, especially for murder trials. At the end of the Nuremberg Trials the courtroom was refurbished, and is now smaller. A wall that had been removed during the trials in order to create more space was re-erected. In addition, the judges’ bench was turned 90 degrees and is no longer situated in front of the window, but stands where the witness box was placed during the trials. 

From the year 2000 on, courtroom 600 could be visited by tourists, during weekends. In December 2008, the courtroom was closed to the public due to construction works creating a permanent exhibition. The Nuremberg Trials Memorial hosted by the Nuremberg Municipal Museums was opened in November 2010. Since 2022, a media installation creates a virtual illusion of the courtroom at the time of the Nuremberg Trials.

References

External links 

 Memorium Nuremberg Trials
  History of the Palace of Justice

Buildings and structures in Nuremberg
Courthouses
Nuremberg trials
Museums in Nuremberg
Buildings and structures completed in 1916